Atomtronics is the emerging quantum technology of matter-wave circuits which coherently guide propagating ultra-cold atoms. The systems typically include components analogous to those found in electronic or optical systems, such as beam splitters and transistors. Applications range from studies of fundamental physics to the development of practical devices.

Etymology 
Atomtronics is a portmanteau of "atom" and "electronics", in reference to the creation of atomic analogues of electronic components, such as transistors and diodes, and also electronic materials such as semiconductors. The field itself has considerable overlap with atom optics and quantum simulation, and is not strictly limited to the development of electronic-like components.

Methodology 
Three major elements are required for an atomtronic circuit. The first is a Bose-Einstein condensate, which is needed for its coherent and superfluid properties, although an ultracold Fermi gas may also be used for certain applications. The second is a tailored trapping potential, which can be generated optically, magnetically, or using a combination of both. The final element is a method to induce the movement of atoms within the potential, which can be achieved in several ways. For example, a transistor-like atomtronic circuit may be realized by a ring-shaped trap divided into two by two moveable weak barriers, with the two separate parts of the ring acting as the drain and the source and the barriers acting as the gate. As the barriers move, atoms flow from the source to the drain. It is now possible to coherently guide matterwaves over distances of up to 40 cm in ring-shaped atomtronic matterwave guides.

Applications 
The field of atomtronics is still very young. Any schemes realized thus far are proof-of-principle. Applications include:
 gravimetry
 rotational sensing via the Sagnac effect
 quantum computing

Obstacles to the development of practical sensing devices are largely due to the technical challenges of creating Bose-Einstein condensates. They require bulky lab-based setups not easily suitable for transportation. However, creating portable experimental setups is an active area of research.

See also
 Unconventional computing

References

External links 
 
 

Electronics
Emerging technologies